Chariergus is a genus of beetles in the family Cerambycidae, containing the following species:

 Chariergus caeruleus Napp & Reynaud, 1998
 Chariergus tabidus (Klug, 1825)

References

Unxiini